King Hui of Zhou, personal name Ji Lang, was the seventeenth king of the Chinese Zhou dynasty and the fifth of Eastern Zhou.

Family
Queens:
 Queen Chen
 Queen Hui of Zhou, of the Gui clan of Chen, known as Chen Gui; possibly a daughter of Duke Xuan of Chen; married in 676 BC; the mother of Crown Prince Zheng and Prince Dai

Sons:
 Crown Prince Zheng (d. 619 BC), ruled as King Xiang of Zhou from 651–619 BC
 Prince Dai (672–635 BC), ruled as Duke Zhao of Gan until 635 BC

Daughters:
 Wang Ji
 Married Duke Xiang of Song (d. 637 BC)

Ancestry

See also
Family tree of ancient Chinese emperors

References 

652 BC deaths
Zhou dynasty kings
7th-century BC Chinese monarchs
Year of birth unknown